Haberlandia lusamboensis is a moth in the family Cossidae. It is found in Lusambo and Katakokombe in the Democratic Republic of the Congo into the south-eastern Republic of the Congo. The habitat consists of moist and drier types of lowland rainforests.

The wingspan is about 23.5 mm for males and 27.5 mm for females. The forewings are deep colonial buff with isabella colour lines from the costal margin to the dorsum. The hindwings are light yellowish olive with a reticulated (net-like) pattern of isabella. The hindwings of the females are similar to those of the males, but the inner half of the wing is pure isabella.

Etymology
The species is named for Lusambo, the type locality.

References

Natural History Museum Lepidoptera generic names catalog

Moths described in 2011
Metarbelinae
Taxa named by Ingo Lehmann